The Dumoulin Islands are a small group of rocky islands in the Antarctic region at the northeast end of the Geologie Archipelago,  north of Astrolabe Glacier Tongue. On 22 January 1840, a French Antarctic expedition led by Captain Jules Dumont d'Urville, aboard his flagship Astrolabe, landed a party on one of these islands, Rocher du Débarquement. Dumont d'Urville named the group of islands in honor of the hydrographer of his expedition, Clément Adrien Vincendon-Dumoulin.

The islands were roughly charted by the Australasian Antarctic Expedition, 1911–14, under Mawson. The island group was photographed from the air by U.S. Navy Operation Highjump, 1946–47, and recharted by a French Antarctic Expedition under André-Frank Liotard, 1949–51.

See also 
 List of Antarctic and sub-Antarctic islands

References 

  Map of Pointe Géologie archipelago, site of Service Hydrographique et Océanographique de la Marine
  IGN Map of Pointe Géologie archipelago, site of Secretariat of the Antarctic Treaty, Documents, Historic Sites and Monuments
  The Dumoulin islands and Débarquement Rock in the Pilote de Terre Adélie, site of Secretariat of the Antarctic Treaty, Documents, Historic Sites and Monuments
  The Dumoulin islands by Dubouzet in 1840, site of Secretariat of the Antarctic Treaty, Documents, Historic Sites and Monuments

Islands of Adélie Land